Pospíšil (feminine Pospíšilová) is a Czech surname. Notable people with the surname include:

 Alžběta "Eliška" Pospíšilová (1900–1994)
 Antonín Pospíšil (1903–1973), Czechoslovak politician
 Christian Pospischil (born 1985), German football player
 Craig Pospisil  American playwright
 David Pospíšil (born 1970), Czech ice hockey player
 František Pospíšil (born 1944), Czech ice hockey player
 Jana Pospíšilová, Czech tennis player
 Jaroslav Pospíšil, Czech tennis player
 Jaroslav Pospíšil (canoeist), Czech canoeist
 Jiří Pospíšil (born 1975), Czech politician
 John Pospisil, American sound editor 
 Josef Pospíšil, Czech skier
 Kristián Pospíšil, Slovak ice hockey player
 Martin Pospíšil, Czech footballer
 Michal Pospíšil (born 1979), Czech footballer
 Miroslav Pospíšil, Czech footballer
 Peter Pospíšil (1944–2006), Slovak handball player
 Robert Pospíšil (born 1977), Czech ice hockey player
 Tomáš Pospíšil (footballer) (born 1991), Czech association football player
 Tomáš Pospíšil (ice hockey) (born 1987), Czech ice hockey player
 Vasek Pospisil, Canadian tennis player
 Věra Pospíšilová-Cechlová, Czech track and field athlete

 Vlasta Pospíšilová, Czech animator and director of Fimfarum and Pat and Mat

 Victor J. Pospishil, Austrian-US Ukrainian Catholic priest
 Pospíšil brothers, Czech cycle ball champions
 Jan Pospíšil
 Jindřich Pospíšil

Czech-language surnames